Rodrigo Baldasso da Costa (born 27 August 1980), simply known Rodrigo, is a Brazilian former professional footballer who played as a central defender.

Career
Rodrigo began his career in Brazil, playing for his local club Ponte Preta and after spending 3 seasons there, being 2005 Copa Libertadores champion for São Paulo.

In February 2005 he moved to Dynamo Kyiv, which he signed a new contract in August 2006. He transferred himself to Flamengo in December 2007. In his first game as a starter for Flamengo on 7 February 2008, Rodrigo fractured his arm, had a surgery and stayed out of the fields for few months. In July 2008, Rodrigo moved to São Paulo on a contract of loan until December 2008. In January 2009, the loan contract was extended to July 2009. On 11 February 2010 Dynamo Kiev confirmed that the 28-year-old center back would play on loan for one year at Gremio Porto Alegre. Later in 2010, however, Rodrigo left Grêmio for city rivals Internacional. On 11 January 2011, Rodrigo joined Esporte Clube Vitória on a free transfer.
On 7 December 2012, Rodrigo joined Goiás Esporte Clube. On 27 November 2017, his team was leading 2–0 against Esporte Clube Vitória before he was sent off after made twice an invasive exploration of his opponent's buttocks. The match was abandoned with eight minutes remaining when Ponte fans invaded the pitch after Vitoria's third goal.

Honours

Club
Dynamo Kyiv
Ukrainian Premier League: 2006–07
Ukrainian Cup: 2006–07

Flamengo
Campeonato Carioca: 2008

São Paulo
Campeonato Brasileiro Série A: 2008

Grêmio
Campeonato Gaúcho: 2010

Internacional
Campeonato Gaúcho: 2011

 Vasco da Gama
Campeonato Carioca: 2015, 2016

Individual
 Campeonato Carioca Team of the year: 2016

Career statistics
As of 15 June 2009

* Include 4 games and 0 goals in Campeonato Carioca 2008.

** Include 15 games and 2 goals in 2009 Campeonato Paulista.

*** See * and **.

References

External links
Rodrigo's profile at Dynamo's official site
Profile at São Paulo 
CBF 
Profile at Futpédia 

Brazilian expatriate footballers
Campeonato Brasileiro Série A players
Campeonato Brasileiro Série B players
Associação Atlética Ponte Preta players
São Paulo FC players
FC Dynamo Kyiv players
CR Flamengo footballers
Grêmio Foot-Ball Porto Alegrense players
Sport Club Internacional players
Esporte Clube Vitória players
Goiás Esporte Clube players
CR Vasco da Gama players
Ukrainian Premier League players
Expatriate footballers in Ukraine
Association football central defenders
Footballers from São Paulo (state)
1980 births
Living people
Brazilian expatriate sportspeople in Ukraine
Brazilian footballers